Terry Arthur Prue (born 11 December 1948) is a retired Australian Test cricket match umpire, from Western Australia.

He umpired 9 Test matches between 1988 and 1994.  His first match was between Australia and the West Indies at Perth on 2 December to 6 December 1988, won by the West Indies by 169 runs, in spite of Merv Hughes taking 5/130 and 8/87, including a hat-trick spread over two innings and three overs. Prue’s partner was Robin Bailhache, standing in his final Test match.

Prue’s last Test match was between Australia and South Africa at Adelaide on 28 January to 1 February 1994, won by Australia by 191 runs with a century to Steve Waugh and 7 wickets to Craig McDermott.  Prue’s colleague was Darrell Hair.

Prue umpired 39 One Day International (ODI) matches between 1988 and 1999. Altogether, he umpired 75 first-class matches in his career between 1983 and 2000.

See also
 List of Test cricket umpires
 List of One Day International cricket umpires

External links
 
 

1948 births
Living people
Australian Test cricket umpires
Australian One Day International cricket umpires